The Bateleur is a South African self-propelled multiple rocket launcher. It is a 127mm system with a wheeled launcher vehicle, disposable pods, and fire control equipment developed by Denel Land Systems. Based on a mine protected Kwêvoël 100 10 ton 6x6 carrier. Its mission is to engage in counter-battery strikes against hostile artillery and air defences as far as 36 km (22 mi) away. Other potential warheads include cluster and an anti-tank mine dispenser. The weapon can fire up to 40 127mm pre-fragmented high explosive warheads to ranges of 7.5km to 36km at sea level singly or using ripple fire, firing up to 1 rocket per second. Reload can take less than 10 minutes and in/out-of-action time is one and two minutes respectively. The system is supported by a Kwêvoël 100 ammunition truck carrying 96 rockets and crew who help with the reloading. 

The system was previously called the Valkiri MkII as it was developed from the Valkiri MRLS which is itself based on the Soviet BM-21 Grad.

Variants 

 Bateleur FV2 (current version): 40 launch tubes mounted on an armoured Samil 100 6x6 truck.
 Modified version to fire 122mm rockets

Operators 
 - South African National Defence Force: 25

References 

Wheeled self-propelled rocket launchers
Rocket artillery
Military equipment introduced in the 1970s
Cold War artillery of South Africa
Field artillery of the Cold War
127 mm artillery
Denel
Multiple rocket launchers